Erigeron jamaicensis is a Caribbean and Mesoamerican species of flowering plant in the family Asteraceae commonly called Jamaican fleabane. It is native to Mexico, Central America, and the Greater Antilles.

Erigeron jamaicensis is a perennial herb sprouting from a rootstock. Stems are long and slender, up to 30 cm (12 inches) tall. Each stem has one or a few flower heads, each with white ray florets and yellow disc florets.

References

jamaicensis
Plants described in 1759
Flora of the Caribbean
Flora of Mexico
Flora of Central America
Taxa named by Carl Linnaeus
Flora without expected TNC conservation status